The Battle at Tacna was an engagement during the War of the Pacific (1879–1883) between Chile and the Allied Forces of Peru and Bolivia. It was fought on May 20, 1880, with the forces aligned as follows:

Chilean North Operations Army 
Commanding General: Manuel Baquedano González
Chief of Staff: Col. Velasquez

Infantry
I Division
Col. Santiago Amengual
Strength: 2,547 men
Esmeralda Infantry Regiment (Col. Santiago Amengual) (8 companies)
Navales Infantry Battalion (Col. Martiniano Urriola) (4 companies)
Chillán Infantry Battalion (Juan Vargas Pinochet) (4 companies)
Valparaíso Infantry Battalion (Jacinto Niño) (3 companies)
II Division
Lt. Col. Francisco Barcelo
Strength: 2,130 men
2nd Line Infantry Regiment (Col. Estanislao del Canto)
Santiago Infantry Regiment (Lt. Col. Francisco Barcelo)
Atacama Infantry Regiment (Lt. Col. Juan Martinez)
III Division
Col. Jose Domingo Amunategui
Strength: 1,858 men
Artillería de Marina Infantry Regiment
Coquimbo Infantry Battalion
Chacabuco Infantry Battalion
IV Division
Col. Orozimbo Barbosa
Strength: 2,285 men
Lautaro Infantry Battalion
Cazadores del Desierto Infantry Battalion
Zapadores Infantry Battalion (Lt. Col. Ricardo Santa Cruz)
Reserve
Col. Mauricio Muñoz
Strength: 2,335 men
"Buin" 1st Line Infantry Regiment (Col. Juan Leon Garcia)
3rd Line Infantry Regiment  (Col. Ricardo Castro)
4th Line Infantry Regiment (Col. Luis Solo de Zaldívar)

Cavalry 
Granaderos Regiment (Horse Grenadiers)
Cazadores Regiment (Light Cavalry)
Carabineros de Yungay Regiment (Light Cavalry-Carabiners)

Artillery 
37 cannons and 4 machine guns from the 1st Artillery Regiment

Allies 
Commanding General: Narciso Campero, Bolivian Army
Strength: 13,650 men

I Southern Peruvian Army 
I Division
Col. Justo Pastor Dávila
Lima Nº 11 Battalion
Cazadores de Cuzco Battalion
II Division
Col. Andrés Avelino Cáceres
Zepita Battalion
Cazadores de Misti Battalion
III Division
Col. Belisario Suárez
Arica Battalion
Pisagua Battalion
IV Division
Col. Jacinto Mendoza
Victoria Battalion
Huascar Battalion
V Division
Col. Alejandro Herrera
Ayacucho Battalion
Arequipa Battalion
VI Division
César Canevaro
Lima Nº 21 Battalion
Cazadores del Rimac Battalion (Col. Víctor Fajardo)
Nacionales Division
Col. del Solar
Formed by civilians and policemen of Tacna (the latter from the Peruvian Civil Guard)
Cavalry
Husares de Junin Squadron
Gendarmes de Tacna Squadron
Guias Squadron
Flanqueadores de Tacna Squadron
Artillery
10 cannons and 3 machine guns

Bolivian Army 
I Division
Col. Severino Zapata
Viedma Battalion
Padilla Battalion
Sucre Battalion
II Division
Col. Claudio Acosta
Tarija Battalion
Chorolque Battalion
Grau Battalion
Loa Battalion
III Division
Col. Idelfonso Murgia
Murillo Battalion
Alianza Battalion
IV Division
Col. Alfonso Gonzalez
Aroma Battalion
Cavalry
Husares Squadron
Coraceros Squadron
Artillery
6 cannons and 4 machine guns

Bibliography 

 

War of the Pacific orders of battle